Otto Didrik Schack, Count of Schackenborg (21 September 1652 – 1 July 1683) was a Danish nobleman and feudal count. He was the first holder of the County of Schackenborg from 1676 to 1683.

Biography 
Otto Didrik Schack was born on 21 September 1652 in Kiel in the Duchy of Holstein. Born into the noble family of Schack, he was the third child and eldest son of the Danish field marshal and privy councillor Hans Schack, and his wife Anna Blome.

In 1667, he was made a hofjunker at the Danish court. From 1670 to 1671 he was educated at the knight academy in Saumur that prepared aristocratic youth for state and military service, and in 1671, he was made a kammerjunker at the Danish court. In 1674 he was appointed amtmann of the Amt of Riberhus, and on 14 June the same year he was awarded the Order of the Dannebrog.

At the death of his father in 1676, he inherited the large manors of Schackenborg and Gram in Southern Jutland, and Gisselfeld in Zealand. Later in the same year, on 23 June 1676, he was awarded the title of feudal count, as the County of Schackenborg was created from the manors of Schackenborg, Sødamgård, Solvig, and Store Tønde.

Count Schack died already on 1 July 1683, aged only 30, in Itzehoe in the Duchy of Holstein. He was succeeded by his eldest surviving son, Hans Schack.

Family
Schack married firstly in 1671 Magdalene Rantzau, daughter of Bertram Rantzau and Dorothea Brockdorff. She died in labour the following year, giving birth to a still-born child.

Schack married secondly on 26 April 1674 Sophie Dorothea von Marschalck, daughter of Johann Friedrich von Marschalck and Margrethe Bielke, by whom he had 6 children:
 Baron Christian Schack (1675–1676)
 Hans Schack, who succeeded him as 2nd Count of Schackenborg.
 Baron Johan Frederik Schack (1677–1690)
 Baroness Charlotte Amalie Schack (1678–1690)
 Baron Bertram Schack (1679–1728), who married Elisabeth Augusta von Arenstorff. They had 4 children.
 Baron Ulrik Frederik Schack (1681–1742), who married Sophie Amalie Giedde. They had 5 children.

Notes and references

Bibliography

External links 
 Official website of Schackenborg Castle

1652 births
1683 deaths
17th-century Danish people
Burials at Trinitatis Church
Knights of the Order of the Dannebrog
Counts of Denmark
Schack family